Redfern may refer to:


People
 Redfern (surname), a list of people with the surname
 Redfern Froggatt (1924–2003), British footballer

Places
 Redfern, New South Wales, a suburb of Sydney, Australia
 Redfern railway station
 Electoral district of Redfern, a former electoral district of the Legislative Assembly in New South Wales
 Municipality of Redfern, a former local government area of Sydney
 Redfern, South Dakota, United States, a former mining community

Businesses
 The Redfern Gallery, a London art gallery specialising in contemporary British art
 Redfern (couture), a former London couture house which had branches in Paris and the United States

Other uses
Redfern All Blacks, an Aboriginal Australian rugby league team established in 1938

See also
 Redfern Oval, Redfern, Australia, a football ground
 Redfern Park, Redfern, Australia, a heritage-listed park
 Redfern Building, Manchester, England, a Grade-II listed building
 Walter Redfern Company, an American aircraft manufacturer
 Redfern v Dunlop Rubber Australia Ltd, a case decided in the High Court of Australia